Toholampi is a municipality of Finland.

It is located in the Central Ostrobothnia region. Neighbouring municipalities are Kannus, Kokkola, Lestijärvi and Sievi.

The municipality is unilingually Finnish.

Notable people
Mika Lintilä, politician
Hannu Hirvikoski, writer
Pekka Jylhä, sculptor
Mauri Leppänen, volleyballer
Virve Nuotio, soloist
Samsa Tuikka, runner
Teemu Wirkkala, javelin thrower
Albert Gebhard, painter

References

External links
 
 Municipality of Toholampi – Official website

Municipalities of Central Ostrobothnia
Populated places established in 1865